The School of Information Management (SIM) of Wuhan University is the oldest and largest Library and Information Science (LIS) education and research institution in China. The predecessor of SIM was Boone Library School at Wuchang, which was founded by Mary Elizabeth Wood and Samuel T. Y. Seng in March 1920. In 1953, Boone Library School merged into Wuhan University and became Wuhan University's Department of Library Science. In 1984, the Ministry of Education of China (MOE) approved the set up of the School of Library and Information Science of Wuhan University and it has become the School of Information Management of Wuhan University since 2001.

Faculty
The school has 104 faculty members and staff, among which 32 are professors (including one senior professor and 26 doctoral advisers), 43 are associate professors and advanced researchers.

Programs
SIM consists of five departments: Library Science, Information Management Science, Archival and Government Information Science, Publishing Science and E-Commerce. It offers bachelor's degree programs in each department. It offers seven master’s and doctoral degree programs: in Library Science, Information Science, Archival Science, Publishing Science, Information Resource Management, Management Science and Engineering, and E-commerce. It offers two primary subject doctoral programs: Library, Information and Archives Management, Management Science and Engineering. It offers two post-doctoral research stations: Library, Information and Archives Management, Management Science and Engineering. It offers six programs for specialized master's degrees: Library & Information, Publishing, Project Management, Software Engineering, Engineering Management, and Training Classes for University Teachers.

Its Library Science and Information Science programs were approved by state as state-level key subjects in 2003. “Library, Information and Archives Management” was authenticated by the MOE as state-level key primary subject in 2007. The teaching team of Library and Information Science won an award as the "national teaching team". In 2009, SIM participated in iSchool and became a member, the only one from a developing country.

Affiliated Institutes
The Center for Studies of Information Resources (CSIR) of Wuhan University is an affiliate of the School of Information Management. The Chinese national key projects “The 985 Project” and “The 211 Project” have been undertaken by SIM. In 2000, the Ministry of the Information Industry of China set up the National Information Resources Research Base at Wuhan University. In 2006, the General Administration of Press and Publication of China approved the founding of the Advanced Publishing Professionals Training Center. Other affiliate research centers of SIM include: Chinese Scientific Evaluation Research Center of Wuhan University, Intellectual Property Advanced Research Center of Wuhan University, Research Institute of Library Science and Information Science and Chinese Electronic Commerce Research and Development Center of Wuhan University.

References

Wuhan University Faculty of Social Sciences